The Natural History Museum of Erfurt is a natural history museum in Erfurt, Germany.

The museum has a permanent exhibition relating the natural history of the forests, fields, city and the geological history of Thuringia. There is also a special exhibitions programme. The museum has collections of botany, zoology, mineralogy — 6,500 specimens presented by Godehard Schwethelm (1899–1992) — and palaeontology. The statutory goals of the museum are the promotion of scientific research and education, the care of scientific collections and hosting scientific meetings.

See also 
List of museums in Germany
List of natural history museums

External links 
 

Museums in Erfurt
History of Thuringia
Erfurt